Friedrich Wilderness Park lies at the southern end of the Texas Hill Country. The park is hilly due to its location on the Balcones escarpment that separates the Texas Hill Country from the flat South Texas region.

History
Norma Friedrich Ward donated  of land to San Antonio, Texas, for use as a public park. Additional land was donated by Wilbur Matthews and Glen Martin. The park was developed with monies from Ms Ward and a grant from the Texas Parks and Wildlife Department. The park opened in 1978.

Notable features

Endangered bird
One endangered bird, the golden-cheeked warbler spends summer in the park.

Topography

The park is in the transition zone between the flat South Texas region and the Texas Hill Country.

The highest hill in the park is  higher (1425 feet above sea level). The skyscrapers of Downtown San Antonio can be seen from the highest points in the park.

See also 
 Balcones escarpment
 Texas Hill Country

References

External links
 Official website
 Bird list
 Friends of Friedrich Wilderness Park

Parks in San Antonio
Protected areas of Bexar County, Texas
Tourist attractions in San Antonio